Trapped in the Closet is a 2007 musical comedy-drama film directed by R. Kelly and Jim Swaffield and written by Kelly based on the song of the same name. Released on August 21, 2007, the film follows protagonist Sylvester, a man who in order not to get caught cheating decides to hide in his affair's closet.

Plot 
Chapter 13
The chapter initially starts with Sylvester and Twan in Sylvester's car though it is not clear at first where they are going. When Sylvester tells Twan to be on his best behavior and reminds Twan about how he got sent to jail, Twan says it "was because of Roxanne and that bitch Tina", which Sylvester remembers his wife mentioning their names on chapter five. The scene soon cuts to Rosie the nosy neighbor and her husband Randolph (played by R. Kelly), who argue over Rosie spying on other neighbors. The argument ends when the scene cuts back to Sylvester explaining to Twan that he has to collect money from someone, he tells Twan to leave the car in drive and be on the lookout and enters a restaurant. An hour goes by with no sign of Sylvester.

Chapter 14
In chapter fourteen, it is revealed that apparently Sylvester and Cathy, who shows up in a blond wig and black dress, had made a deal for Sylvester to get caught by her pastor husband Rufus but the deal had apparently backfired, not only by Cathy's realization that Sylvester and her best friend Gwendolyn were married but also due to Cathy not wanting to end her marriage to Rufus, with Cathy later admitting she had changed her mind on the deal. When Sylvester threatens to leave, Cathy tries to explain the reasons why. A waitress comes by and offers them drinks. Sylvester looks at the waitress thinking to himself that she looked familiar. Meanwhile, outside at Sylvester's car, Twan gets a call from a friend (only shown by a close up of his mouth) about Tina, telling him Tina had stopped prostituting and was working at a "legit" place. He later tells Twan that Tina was working at the same restaurant where Sylvester is at with Cathy. Back at the restaurant, Sylvester notices the waitress but can't think from where, until he sees her name tag which says "Tina". Sylvester then says he wants to talk to her but she gets scared and calls for her friend/co-worker Roxanne, who runs out with a frying pan. After Tina breaks a beer bottle and makes karate-styled moves saying to Sylvester that she and Roxanne take Tae Bo, Cathy and the rest of the patrons leave quickly, leaving Sylvester alone with Tina and Roxanne. Just as Tina and Roxanne are about to attack, Twan comes busting through the door threatening them.

Chapter 15
With Twan, Sylvester, Tina and Roxanne in the now-empty restaurant, Twan seeks revenge on Tina and Roxanne on his arrest three years ago. Sylvester tries calming Twan down reminding him he's on house arrest and that a violent outburst would lead to a more serious time in prison. After convincing Twan to let him talk to them, Sylvester approaches the two ladies and ask them what had happened on the day of his arrest. Tina and Roxanne explain that they were on a "simple operation" describing a "trip" to Atlanta. Roxanne tells Sylvester that a high Twan was swerving on the road and cutting up on the both of them, even turning his music loud playing "Mary Jane" and screaming "I'm Rick James, bitch!" Tina explains that as soon as that happened, they heard not only police squad cars but also a helicopter. Twan's car breaks down and all three are eventually arrested. In the interrogation room, the police tell the women that Twan blamed the drug deal on them in order to save his own skin. It is then when Roxanne tells Twan she turned him in. Roxanne says Tina protected him because Tina was pregnant with Twan's baby at the time.

Chapter 16
Sylvester, stunned at first at the news of Tina having Twan's child, congratulates Twan on the news but Twan is not convinced, accusing Tina of lying on him, which causes Tina's eye to twitch, which had started when Sylvester had first approached her near the end of chapter 14. When Sylvester asks Roxanne about it, Roxanne explains a pimp had hit Tina in the eye a year ago and that she's had bad nerves ever since. Twan then pulls Sylvester to the side and begins wondering if he is really the father of Tina's child, Sylvester convinces him that a child would calm him down. When Twan tells Tina that he wants to make this work, Roxanne kisses Tina and reveals they are lovers.

Chapter 17
Stunned at the news of Roxanne and Tina being lovers, a frustrated Sylvester points his gun at the both of them, but soon stops because of his tolerance to lesbianism, while Twan kept egging him to shoot them. Sylvester tries to get Twan to leave the restaurant. It's only after Twan threatens Tina and Roxanne that he will buy a gun and come back for them later that Sylvester finally convinces Twan to leave.

Chapter 18
Back at the car as they drive away, Twan is still angry over seeing Roxanne and Tina together, despite Sylvester's efforts to calm him down. Around this time, Sylvester gets a phone call from Gwendolyn, who tells him that his parents, O'Dale and Myrna, got into it and Myrna had O'Dale put in jail. The scene then shifts to Rufus' church where he is leading the worship song, "Jesus Will Work It Out", with Reverend Mosley James Evans and the Peace Within Choir. When the song reaches a climax, Rufus gets a phone call and excuses himself to his office. It's Chuck, who's crying and upset over not seeing Rufus since the incident in the earlier chapters. Rufus and Chuck argue when Cathy walks in Rufus' office. When Cathy asks Rufus who was on the phone, Chuck, who can be heard accidentally on speaker phone, cries out for Rufus, which angers Cathy and the two argue before Rufus sends Cathy out to deal with the situation. Rufus then tries to let Chuck come see him so they can talk but Chuck refuses. Rufus then tells Chuck that because he loves his wife and is a pastor, he doesn't want to see Chuck anymore, which angers Chuck, who threatens to reveal their relationship. When Rufus again tries to get Chuck to come see him, Chuck reveals he is recovering at a hospital.

Chapter 19
Reverend Mosley James Evans and the Peace Within Choir attempt to persuade Pimp Lucius, a pimp with a severe stuttering problem, to stop pimping and to turn his life around. As the choir sings "you can do it Pimp Lucius," Lucius pretends to accept the offer and leaves the church.  However, he then tells his pimpin' partner, Bishop Craig, that he is never going to "s-s-s-s-s-stop p-p-p-pimpin," because "p-p-p-pimpin's for life." Then he tells Bishop Craig "now let's get this mmm-mmmmm money."

Chapter 20
This chapter shows Rosie the Nosy Neighbor's house where Rosie is seen in her chair reading the Bible when her husband Randolph comes in shouting, "he's got the package!" to Rosie. Unwilling to listen at first, when Randolph tells her he has news on the pastor (Rufus), she demands what was going on with him. After a few bickers, Randolph tells Rosie the story: while working as a janitor for the church, Randolph hears Rufus coming into the office. Randolph hid in the closet and unintentionally overheard the conversation seen in chapter eighteen among Chuck, Rufus and Cathy. After relaying the story, Rosie asks Randolph why he had said the pastor had "the package", Randolph says that Chuck told him he was at the hospital. Rosie immediately decides to inform the masses, despite Randolph's protests. The chapter ends with Randolph sitting on the couch, falling asleep.

Chapter 21
Sylvester and Twan go to visit an apparent mobster named Joey. Sylvester informs Joey of some job that could get them a lot of money. While there, Joey accuses Twan of being a cop, as well as calling him "LL Fool J," deeply offending Twan. Sylvester, trying to defuse the situation, asks Twan to wait outside the office while he and Joey discuss business. As Twan leaves the room, he remarks, "I'll be listening from the outside." Joey replies, "Yeah, yeah, whatever. Mama said knock you out, fuck outta here." While waiting outside, Twan has a nightmare of Sylvester and him in the same situation, being pointed at with guns. In the end, Sylvester wakes Twan up, then Joey and Sylvester say their goodbyes, and Joey asks Sylvester to tell Gwendolyn he says hello, as their deal is sealed.

Chapter 22
The scene opens to the voicemail of Dale and Myrna, Sylvester's parents, and eventually fades into the middle of the voicemail box, where the narrator (Kelly) says, "and now the rumor." Throughout a series of phone conversations among all of the original characters from Chapters 1–12 and those introduced in Chapter 13–22, rumors of "The Package" circulate. Because Chuck has it, it has possibly been passed to Rufus, to his wife Cathy, to Sylvester, and to Gwendolyn. In addition, Bridget realizes that James knows both Chuck and Rufus, though he tried to hide it from her earlier, suggesting he may be on the "down-low" with Chuck as well. Gwendolyn also cheated on Sylvester with James however she used a condom as revealed in Chapter 4. This would put Bridget, Big Man, and James at serious risk. Lastly, Pimp Lucius gets a similar concerned call from an unidentified woman (who may have gotten "The Package" from Big Man, and subsequently passed it to Pimp Lucius).

Cast
 Robert Kelly as Sylvester, Randolph, Rev. Mos, Pimp Lucius and the narrator
 Cat Wilson as Gwendolyn
 Rolando A. Boyce as Rufus
 LeShay Tomlinson as Cathy
 Malik Middleton as Chuck
 Michael Kenneth Williams
 Drevon Cooks as Big Man
 Rebecca Field as Bridget
 Eric Lane as Twan
 LaDonna Tittle as Rosie
 Tracey Bonner as Tina
 Jermaine "Janky" Salmond as Street
 Erika Ringor as Roxanne
 Will Oldham as Sgt. Platoon
 Greg Hollimon as Det. Tom
 Brian "Wildcat" Smith as Bishop Craig
 Pierre Maurey as Church Man
 Brendan Averett as Henchman #1
 Gino Crededio as Henchman #2
 Dominic Capone III as Joey
 Katherine Mitchell as Myrna
 Alan Donovan as Desk Sergeant
 Heather Zagone as Dixie

References 

R. Kelly
American musical films
Trapped in the Closet
2000s English-language films
2000s American films